Roderick Alexander McRobie Campbell (born 15 June 1953) is a retired Scottish National Party politician.  He was the Member of the Scottish Parliament (MSP) for the North East Fife constituency from 2011 to 2016.

Early life
Campbell was born on 15 June 1953 in Edinburgh. He was educated at Reading School and graduated from Exeter University with a BA (Hons) in Politics. He received a LL.M in Human Rights Law from the University of Strathclyde.

Campbell first qualified as a solicitor, in both England and Wales and Scotland, and rose to become partner in a multinational firm of lawyers based in London. In 2008, he was called to the bar in Scotland. He is a practising member of the Faculty of Advocates.

Political career
Campbell joined the Scottish National Party in 1995.

Campbell stood for the North East Fife constituency at the 2005 and 2010 general elections, although he was unsuccessful and failed to unseat Menzies Campbell of the Liberal Democrats. Campbell also stood unsuccessfully at the 2007 Scottish Parliament election, where Iain Smith successfully retained the North East Fife seat.

At the 2011 Scottish Parliament election, Campbell beat Smith in the contest, and was elected as the MSP for North East Fife. As a MSP, he was a member of the European and External Relations Committee and the Justice Committee. At the 2016 Campbell finished second to Scottish Liberal Democrat leader Willie Rennie, and was not elected.

References

External links 
 
Roderick Campbell's Twitter page
Roderick Campbell's SNP page

1953 births
Living people
Politicians from Edinburgh
People educated at Reading School
Alumni of the University of Exeter
Alumni of the University of Strathclyde
Members of the Scottish Parliament 2011–2016
Scottish National Party MSPs
Members of the Faculty of Advocates
Politics of Fife